Ecobank, whose official name is Ecobank Transnational Inc. (ETI), is a pan-African banking conglomerate, with banking operations in 33 African countries. It is the leading independent regional banking group in West Africa and Central Africa, serving wholesale and retail customers. It also maintains subsidiaries in Eastern and Southern Africa. ETI has an affiliate in France, and representative offices in China, Dubai, South Africa, and the United Kingdom.

Overview
ETI is a large financial services provider with offices in 36 countries around the world, and presence in 35 sub-Saharan countries. , ETI's customer base was estimated at 32 million. ETI's branch network numbered 1,305, with 1,981 networked ATMs.

Group network
, Ecobank Transnational had banking operations in 36 African countries, with representative offices in Angola, Beijing, Dubai, Ethiopia, South Africa and the United Kingdom:

Ecobank Transnational has operational bank subsidiaries in the following countries, as of July 2013:

Africa

 Ecoboank Angola - (Representative office in Luanda)
 Ecobank Benin
 Ecobank Burkina Faso
 Ecobank Burundi
 Ecobank  Cameroon
 Ecobank Cape Verde
 Ecobank Central African Republic
 Ecobank Chad
 Ecobank Congo Brazzaville
 Ecobank Côte d'Ivoire
 Ecobank Democratic Republic of the Congo
 Ecobank Ethiopia - (Representative office in Addis Ababa)
 Ecobank Equatorial Guinea
 Ecobank Gabon
 Ecobank Gambia
 Ecobank Ghana
 Ecobank Guinea
 Ecobank Guinea-Bissau
 Ecobank Kenya
 Ecobank Liberia
 Ecobank Malawi
 Ecobank Mali
 Ecobank Mozambique
 Ecobank Niger
 Ecobank Nigeria (includes Oceanic Bank)
 Ecobank Rwanda
 Ecobank São Tomé and Príncipe
 Ecobank Senegal
 Ecobank Sierra Leone
 Ecobank South Africa (Representative office in Johannesburg)
 Ecobank South Sudan
 Ecobank Tanzania 
 Ecobank Togo
 Ecobank Uganda
 Ecobank Zambia
 Ecobank Zimbabwe

Outside Africa
 Paris, France - Affiliate office
 London, United Kingdom - France affiliate representative office
 Dubai, United Arab Emirates - Representative office
 Beijing, China - Representative office

History
ETI, a public limited liability company, was established as a bank holding company in 1985 under a private sector initiative spearheaded by the Federation of West African Chambers of Commerce and Industry, with the support of the Economic Community of West African States (ECOWAS). In the early 1980s the banking industry in West Africa was dominated by foreign and state-owned banks. There were hardly any commercial banks in West Africa owned and managed by the African private sector. ETI was founded with the objective of filling this vacuum.

The Federation of West African Chambers of Commerce promoted and initiated a project for the creation of a private regional banking institution in West Africa. In 1984, Ecopromotions S.A. was incorporated. Its founding shareholders raised the seed capital for the feasibility studies and the promotional activities leading to the creation of ETI.

In October 1985, ETI was incorporated with an authorised capital of US$100 million. The initial paid up capital of US$32 million was raised from over 1,500 individuals and institutions from West African countries. The largest shareholder was the ECOWAS Fund for Cooperation, Compensation and Development (ECOWAS Fund), the development finance arm of ECOWAS. A Headquarters’ Agreement was signed with the government of Togo in 1985 which granted ETI the status of an international organisation with the rights and privileges necessary for it to operate as a regional institution, including the status of a non-resident financial institution.

ETI has two specialised subsidiaries: Ecobank Development Corporation (EDC) and eProcess International (eProcess). EDC was incorporated with a broad mandate to develop Ecobank’s investment banking and advisory businesses throughout the countries where Ecobank operates. EDC operates brokerage houses on all 3 stock exchanges in West Africa and has obtained licences to operate on the two stock exchanges in Central Africa: the Douala Stock Exchange in Cameroon and the Libreville Exchange in Gabon. The mandate of eProcess is to manage the Group’s information technology function with a view to ultimately centralising the Group’s middle and back office operations to improve efficiency, service standards and reduce costs.

Governance lapses 
Ecobank has been marred by several well publicized governance lapses:

The sacking and reinstatement of the CFO in 2014 after she alleged:  "... Mrs. Do Rego sent a letter to the SEC alleging that the Chairman, Mr. Lawson and GCEO Mr.Tanoh were attempting to sell non-core assets at values below market, that both individuals ‘attempted’ to manipulate the 2012 results to enable the Group (ETI) to show a much better 2013 growth, and she questioned procedures around the approval of a substantial increase in Mr.Tanoh’s 2012 bonus (which he subsequently opted not to receive). She also alleged that she was asked to write off debts owed by a real estate company Mr. Lawson chairs..."

The Chairman resigned but later sued Ecobank to force them to investigate the allegations backed by an confidential E&Y audit report on serious allegations of Fraud.

" As the Chairman of the Board at the time the EY investigation was commissioned, I instructed my lawyers to write a letter to the Board expressly warning them of the illegality of presenting these accounts to the shareholders without making full disclosure of the facts. This letter was delivered to board members on the 26th June 2014 (See Appendix 1). Unfortunately the letter was ignored by the Board of ETI and this obvious dereliction of duty continues to date"

Ecobank then settled the matter with the chairman and absolved him of any wrongdoing.

Subsidiaries
The Specialized subsidiary companies of Ecobank include the following:

 EBI SA Groupe Ecobank - Paris, France
 EBI SA Representative Office - London, United Kingdom
 Ecobank Development Corporation (EDC) - Lomé, Togo
 EDC Investment Corporation - Abidjan, Côte d’Ivoire
 EDC Investment Corporation - Douala, Cameroon
 EDC Securities Limited - Lagos, Nigeria
 EDC Stockbrokers Limited - Accra, Ghana
 Ecobank Asset Management - Abidjan, Côte d’Ivoire
 e-Process International SA - Accra, Ghana
 Ecobank Asset Management Company P/L - Harare, Zimbabwe

The Ecobank Nedbank alliance
With more than 1,500 branches in 35 countries, the Ecobank-Nedbank Alliance is the largest banking network in Africa. The alliance was formed in 2008 between the Ecobank Group and the Nedbank Group, one of South Africa's four largest financial services providers, with a growing footprint of operations across the Southern African Development Community.

Ownership
The shares of Ecobank Transnational Inc., the parent company of Ecobank, are traded on three West African stock exchanges, namely: the Ghana Stock Exchange (GSE), the Nigeria Stock Exchange (NSE) and the BRVM stock exchange in Abidjan, Ivory Coast. , the ten largest shareholders in Ecobank Transnational were as follows:

See also

Ecobank Ghana
Ecobank Nigeria
Ecobank Uganda
Ecobank Zimbabwe

References

External links

 Ecobank official site
Ecobank Transnational Incorporated at Nigerian Stock Exchange 
Ecobank Nigeria at Nigerian Stock Exchange 
  Modern Ghana, article 'Ecobank Takes over BICA in CAR'

Company Profile At Bloomberg.com
Nigeria: Qatari Bank Acquires N36 Billion Amcon's Stake in Ecobank

Banks of Togo
Companies listed on the Nigerian Stock Exchange
Companies listed on the Ghana Stock Exchange